Daniel Chan Hiu-tung (born 3 September 1975) is a Hong Kong singer, songwriter, and actor.  He is most notable as one of the young talents in the 1990s music scene.

Career

Singer
In 2000, following the death of his manager Rebecca Leung, he began changing his singing style.

After nearly three years of being absent from the music scene, he released his 11th Chinese album So Hot in early September 2011. Chan is a Buddhist.

Actor
As for his movie career, he took part in many films since 1994. In 1996, he played the character Wang Wen Jun from the movie " Hu-Du-Men" which helped him receive the best newcomer nomination in the 16th Hong Kong film awards.  In 1997, he played teenager Shum Chi Hong (Shen Zhi Kang) in "First love unlimited". 

After that, he performed in the big budget Chinese New Year movie alongside Stephen Chow in The Lucky Guy in 1998, together Shu Qi, Sammi Cheng, Stephen Chow ...Later he starred in the film A War of No Desire where he acted as Francis Ng's brother in 2000. At the same time, he shot For Bad Boys Only, with famous ators :Ekin Cheng, Louis Koo, Shu Qi ... . Chan is however most well known for his appearance as an actor in the movie First love unlimited (1997) with Gigi Leung as one of the best couple, Feel 100% II (2001 -as Hui Lok, went with Nikki Chow, Eason Chan and Miriam Yeung ) and the resulting TV series Feel 100%.

Discography

Cantonese

Mandarin

Filmography

Movies

TV Series

References

External links
 Official website
 Daniel Chan's yahoo blog
 

1975 births
Living people
Cantopop singer-songwriters
Hong Kong Mandopop singers
Hong Kong male actors
Hong Kong male singers
Hong Kong male singer-songwriters
Hong Kong Buddhists